The Shrink Is In is a 2001 American comedy film directed by Richard Benjamin and starring Courteney Cox and David Arquette.

Plot 
Samantha is a travel journalist who is still recovering from the break-up with her last boyfriend, when her psychiatrist, Dr. Louise Rosenberg, suffers a nervous breakdown. While Samantha is canceling her appointments, her new neighbor, Michael, comes for a session. Having never met the real Dr. Rosenberg, she poses as her shrink in an attempt to steer him away from his girlfriend and towards her. Because of her new situation, Samantha ends up seeing a few of Dr. Rosenberg's other patients, including eccentric magazine salesman Henry . Thus leading her to question her life, including whether her 'perfect man' is actually what she truly desires after all.

Cast 
Courteney Cox as Samantha Crumb
David Arquette as Henry Popopolis
David James Elliott as Michael
Carol Kane as Dr. Louise Rosenberg
Kimberley Davies as Isabelle
Viola Davis as Robin
Jon Polito as Judge Bob

References

External links 
 
 

2001 films
2001 romantic comedy films
American romantic comedy films
Films directed by Richard Benjamin
Films produced by Andrew Form
Films about health care
American screwball comedy films
Universal Pictures films
2000s English-language films
2000s American films
2000s screwball comedy films